Trivirostra is a genus of small sea snails, marine gastropod mollusks in the family Triviidae, the false cowries or trivias.

Species
Species within the genus Trivirostra include:

 Trivirostra akroterion (Cate, 1979)
 Trivirostra angulata Fehse, 2017
 Trivirostra angustata Fehse, 2017
 Trivirostra bitou (Pallary, 1912)
 Trivirostra bocki Schilder, 1944
 Trivirostra boswellae Cate, 1979
 Trivirostra boucancanotica Fehse & Grego, 2002
 Trivirostra catina Fehse, 2017
 Trivirostra clariceae Cate, 1979
 Trivirostra corrugata (Pease, 1868)
 Trivirostra declivis Fehse, 2015
 Trivirostra dekkeri Fehse & Grego, 2009
 Trivirostra directa Fehse, 2017
 Trivirostra dolichis Fehse, 2017
 Trivirostra edgari (Shaw, 1909)
 Trivirostra elongata Ma, 1997 
 Trivirostra ginae Fehse & Grego, 2002
 Trivirostra hordacea (Kiener, 1843)
 Trivirostra houssayica Fehse, 2017
 Trivirostra hyalina Schilder, 1933
 Trivirostra insularum Schilder, 1944
 Trivirostra keehiensis Cate, 1979
 Trivirostra lacrima Fehse, 2015
 Trivirostra letourneuxi Fehse & Grego, 2008
 Trivirostra leylae Fehse & Grego, 2013
 Trivirostra mactanica Fehse & Grego, 2002
 Trivirostra matavai Fehse & Grego, 2013
 Trivirostra natalensis Schilder, 1932
 Trivirostra obliqua Fehse, 2017
 Trivirostra obscura (Gaskoin, 1849)
 Trivirostra oryza (Lamarck, 1811)
 Trivirostra oshimaensis Cate, 1979
 Trivirostra pellucidula (Gaskoin, 1846)
 Trivirostra poppei Fehse, 1999
 Trivirostra prosilia Fehse, 2015
 Trivirostra pseudotrivellona Fehse & Grego, 2008
 Trivirostra pyrena Fehse, 2017
 Trivirostra scabriuscula (Gray, 1827)
 Trivirostra shawi Schilder, 1933
 Trivirostra sphaeroides Schilder, 1933
 Trivirostra spioinsula Cate, 1979
 Trivirostra thaanumi Cate, 1979
 Trivirostra tomlini Schilder & M. Schilder, 1944
 Trivirostra triticum Schilder, 1932
 Trivirostra tryphaenae Fehse, 1998
 Trivirostra turneri Schilder, 1932
 Trivirostra vayssierei Cate, 1979
 Trivirostra vitrina Cate, 1979
 Trivirostra yangi Fehse & Grego, 2006

Species brought into synonymy
 Trivirostra aussiorum Cate, 1973: synonym of Austrotrivia aussiorum (Cate, 1979)
 Trivirostra bayeri Fehse, 1998: synonym of Purpurcapsula bayeri (Fehse, 1998)
 Trivirostra bipunctata (Odhner, 1917): synonym of Ellatrivia bipunctata (Odhner, 1917)
 Trivirostra corinneae (Shaw, 1909) : synonym of Purpurcapsula corinneae (Shaw, 1909)
 Trivirostra cydarum Cate, 1979: synonym of Ellatrivia cydarum (Cate, 1979)
 Trivirostra desirabilis (Iredale, 1912): synonym of Semitrivia desirabilis (Iredale, 1912)
 Trivirostra exigua (Gray, 1831): synonym of Purpurcapsula exigua (Gray, 1831)
 Trivirostra exmouthensis Cate, 1979: synonym of Ellatrivia exmouthensis (Cate, 1979)
 Trivirostra oryzoidea Iredale, 1935: synonym of Ellatrivia oryzoidea (Iredale, 1935)
 Trivirostra pargrando Iredale, 1935: synonym of Ellatrivia bipunctata (Odhner, 1917)
 Trivirostra polynesiae Cate, 1979: synonym of Purpurcapsula polynesiae (C. N. Cate, 1979)
 Trivirostra rubramaculosa Fehse & Grego, 2002: synonym of Purpurcapsula rubramaculosa (Fehse & Grego, 2002)
 Trivirostra zzyzyxia Cate, 1973: synonym of Purpurcapsula zzyzyxia (Cate, 1979)

References

 Vaught, K.C. (1989). A classification of the living Mollusca. American Malacologists: Melbourne, FL (USA). . XII, 195 pp.
 Fehse D. (2002) Beiträge zur Kenntnis der Triviidae (Mollusca: Gastropoda) V. Kritische Beurteilung der Genera und Beschreibung einer neuen Art der Gattung Semitrivia Cossmann, 1903. Acta Conchyliorum 6: 3-48
 Fehse D. & Grego J. 2009. Contributions to the Knowledge of the Triviidae (Mollusca: Gastropoda). X. The Triviidae from the Red Sea with a description of a new genus Purpurcapsula and a new species in the genus Trivirostra Jousseaume, 1884. Visaya 2(5): 18-79, pls. 1-13.

External links
 Jousseaume, F. (1884). Division des Cypraeidae. Le Naturaliste. 6(52): 414-415.

Triviidae